James T. Kloppenberg (born June 23, 1951 in Denver) is an American historian, and Charles Warren Professor of American History, at Harvard University.

Life
He graduated from Dartmouth College summa cum laude, and from Stanford University with an M.A. and Ph.D. in 1980. He has held the Pitt professorship at the University of Cambridge, has taught at the École des hautes études en sciences sociales in Paris, and has taught at Brandeis University.

He and his wife Mary live in Wellesley, Massachusetts.

Awards

 1978–1980 Danforth Fellowship
 1978–1979 Whiting Fellowship
 1991 Guggenheim Fellowship
 1982–1983 American Council of Learned Societies Fellowship
 1987 Merle Curti Award
 1999–2000 National Endowment for the Humanities Fellowship

Works
"Institutionalism, Rational Choice and Historical Analysis", Polity, Vol. 28, No. 1 (Autumn, 1995), pp. 125–128

Chapters

Bibliography
 
 
 
Reading Obama: Dreams, Hopes, and the American Political Tradition (2010 Princeton University Press). 
The Worlds of American Intellectual History (2016 Oxford University Press) with Joel Isaac, Michael O'Brien, and Jennifer Ratner-Rosenhagen
Toward Democracy: The Struggle for Self-Rule in European and American Thought (2016 Oxford University Press)

References

External links
"James's Pragmatism and American Social Thought, 1907-2007", Harvard Divinity School, September 25, 2007
Interview by Charlie Rose re: Obama book, transcript or video, November 10, 2010.

Dartmouth College alumni
Stanford University alumni
Harvard University faculty
Brandeis University faculty
Academic staff of the University of Paris
1951 births
Living people
Academics of the University of Cambridge
21st-century American historians
21st-century American male writers
American male non-fiction writers